Wilinton Aponzá Carabali (born 29 March 2000) is a Colombian professional footballer who plays as a forward for Covilhã, on loan from Portimonense.

Professional career
Aponzá is a youth product of the Colombian club América de Cali, before moving to Portugal with Berço in 2019. On 28 April 2001, he transferred to Portimonense the in the Primeira Liga. He made his professional debut with Portimonense in a 1-0 Primeira Liga loss to F.C. Paços de Ferreira on 29 August 2021.

References

External links
 
 

2000 births
Living people
Footballers from Cali
Colombian footballers
Association football forwards
Portimonense S.C. players
Primeira Liga players
Campeonato de Portugal (league) players
Colombian expatriate footballers
Colombian expatriates in Portugal
Expatriate footballers in Portugal